PS Earl of Arran was a passenger vessel operated by the Ardrossan Steamboat Company from 1860 to 1871 and the  West Cornwall Steam Ship Company from 1871 to 1872

History

She was built by Blackwood and Gordon and launched on 25 April 1860 for the Ardrossan Steamboat Company on the route between Ardrossan and Arran.

She was advertised for sale in 1868 and after being laid up for a while, in early 1870  she was sold to the West Cornwall Steam Ship Company making a living from towing fishing vessels, and also running pleasure cruises from Penzance along the coast. In 1871 she was put on duty providing shipping services between Penzance and the Isles of Scilly.

In 1871 she towed into Penzance an unidentified derelict ship believed to be American, which had four hundred casks of paraffin oil as cargo.

Early in 1872 she was involved with Little Western in recovering property from the wreck of the Delaware which had been wrecked on 20 December 1871 on Mincarlo in the Isles of Scilly.

She was badly damaged after hitting Irishman’s Ledge on the west side of Nornour in the Isles of Scilly on 16 July 1872. She just managed to make it to Nornour Brow where she grounded and where her boilers still stand today. The engine-room filled within five minutes, and in ten minutes the saloon was flooded. The captain successfully transferred all 100 passengers and the mail using the boats to on Nornour Island. The passengers were returned to Penzance the next day on the Little Western.

The enquiry found that Captain Deason had followed the advice of Stephen Woodcock who acted as pilot, but was unlicensed to do so. The ship was said to have cost the company £3,000 and was only insured for £1,000. The wreck was not retrieved.

References

1860 ships
Passenger ships of the United Kingdom
Paddle steamers of the United Kingdom
Steamships of the United Kingdom
Ships built on the River Clyde
Transport in the Isles of Scilly